This is a list of mountains of the Swiss canton of Uri. Uri is a very mountainous canton and lies entirely within the Alps. It is also one of the five cantons having summits above 3,600 metres. Topographically, the most important summit of the canton is that of the Dammastock (most elevated, most prominent and most isolated).

This list only includes significant summits with a topographic prominence of at least . There are over 90 such summits in Uri and they are found in almost all its municipalities. All mountain heights and prominences on the list are from the largest-scale maps available.

List

References

Uri